The Republic of China Armed Forces Museum (AFM) is a museum located on Guiyang Street in the Zhongzheng District of Taipei, Taiwan. It was opened on October 31, 1961, under the administration of the Republic of China Ministry of National Defense Department of History and Translation Office. The Museum aims to show the ROC military heritage of different periods and to inform the public about the military. The museum encompasses 3 floors. 

The museum closed permanently on December 30th, 2021, to be replaced by the upcoming  National Military Museum.

Permanent Exhibits
From the Whampoa Army to the Northern Army
Early Gruelling years in the War of Resistance - Features captured Japanese Military equipment including swords used during the Nanjing Massacre's Contest to kill 100 people using a sword.
Counter Insurgency and Battle of the Taiwan Strait 
Modernization of the Military 
Weapons Collection Room.

Past exhibits

 Army Special Operations Aviation Exhibition (2005)
 Japanese Prisoner of War Camps in Taiwan (2005)
 Military Police Special Exhibition (2006)
 Joint logistics exhibition - Armor Vehicles (2007)
 ROC Reserve Command (2008)
 50th Anniversary of the Second Taiwan Strait Crisis Exhibition (2008)
 ROC Airforce in the New Century - Forward Looking Vision (2009)
 60th Anniversary of the Battle of Guningtou (2009)
 The Great Wall at Sea - Naval Command Exhibition (2010)
 Black Cat Squadron Exhibition (2010)
 CBRN Defense / Chemical Warfare Corps Exhibition (2012)
 90th Anniversary of Whampoa Military Academy Exhibition (2014)
 Thunder Tiger Aerobatic Team Exhibition (2014)
 Fidelity of Military Police (2018)

Controversy
In 1996, a Taiwanese schoolgirl, Chang Fu-chen was raped and murdered at the Armed Forces Museum.  Taipei Police found the girl's body dumped in a suburban Taipei park following the confession of Kuo Ching-ho, a military guard at the museum who was serving his compulsory two-year military service.

Transportation
The museum is accessible within walking distance South from Ximen Station of the Taipei Metro.

See also
 List of museums in Taiwan
 Military Museum of the Chinese People's Revolution
 National Museum of History

References

External

Armed Forces Museum

1961 establishments in Taiwan
Museums established in 1961
Museums in Taipei
Military and war museums in Taiwan
Military of the Republic of China